God Can! is the third contemporary worship music album with worship leader Alvin Slaughter by Integrity/Hosanna! Music. The album was recorded live at Upper Room Ministries in Dix Hills, New York, and released in 1996. On a much anticipated evening on Long Island, New York, 3,000 people came together from all around the tri-state area to worship God. Alvin Slaughter leads you through heartfelt worship, rejoicing and celebration that God alone is able to do all we can ask or think. Includes "Shouts of Joy," "He's All I Need," "Doin' a Good Work," and more.

Track listing
Shouts of Joy - 4:13 
God Can - 3:45 
More Than Enough - 3:34 
Doin' a Good Work - 3:44 
Holy, Holy, Holy - 8:22 
Our Help Is in the Name of the Lord - 3:30 
God Gives His Children a Song - 6:04 
That's When - 4:51 
Jesus, Lord to Me - 5:54 
Alleluia - 6:05 
Jesus Is Everything I Need - 1:37 
He's All I Need - 2:12 
The Wonders of His Hands - 4:13 
I Love You Lord - 1:56 
You Are Worthy to Be Praised - 2:26 
When We All Get to Heaven - 5:56  
In total 65:10

Credits
Producer and Arranger:
 Tom Brooks

Senior Executive Producer:
 Michael Coleman

Executive Producers:
 Don Moen
 Chris Long

A&R Director:
 Chris Thomason

Worship Leader:
 Alvin Slaughter

Musicians:
 Carl Albrecht - Drums
 Abraham Laboriel - Bass
 Tom Brooks - Keyboards
 Phil Hamilton - Guitars

Vocals:
 Gary Anglin - Vocals
 Vanessa Bille - Vocals
 Marshall Carpenter - Vocals 
 Sheila Ravenel Carpenter - Vocals  
 Larry Felder - Vocals 
 Marissa Felder - Vocals     
 Lisette Gonzalez - Vocals 
 Frank Lorenzo - Vocals 
 Jo-Ann Rivera - Vocals  
 Denise Towers - Vocals   
 Rebecca West - Vocals

Choir:
 Hosanna! Music Mass Choir - Choir, Chorus 
 Sheila Ravenel Carpenter - Choir Coordinator  
 Theresa Mensianti - Choir Director

Engineers:
 Glenn "Zippy" Montjoy - Audio Technical Assistant
 Phil Gitomer - Assistant, Assistant Remote Engineer 
 David Hewitt - Engineer, Remote Recording
 Tom Brooks - Mixing
 Ken Love - Mastering    
 Keith Kutcha - Mixing

1996 live albums
Alvin Slaughter albums